Richard Peter Hugh Utley (11 February 1906 – 11 February 1968) was an English first-class cricketer who was a right-handed batsman and a fast bowler.

Utley represented Hampshire and made his first-class debut in the 1927 County Championship against Kent. Utley would play 31 championship matches for Hampshire over the course of two seasons. His final match for Hampshire came in the 1928 season against the touring West Indians. Utley was played as a bowler for the club, with his fast bowling yielding 79 wickets at an average of 26.32, with best innings figures of 6/43.

As well as representing Hampshire, Utley represented the Gentlemen in a single first-class match in 1927 against the Players at The Oval. Utley also played in two first-class matches for the Royal Air Force against the Army and again for the Royal Air Force against the Royal Navy later on in 1928. These two matches yielded Utley 11 wickets at an average of 21.18.

Utley went to the independent St John's College, Portsmouth. Michael Magan's book 'Cradled in History: St. Johns College, Southsea' records: 'Peter Utley went on from St. John's to play cricket for Hampshire against the Australians and for the Gentleman Players at Lords. In after years he was Dom R.P. Utley, OSB, OBE, TD., monk of Ampleforth.'

Utley died in Ampleforth, Yorkshire on 11 February 1968.

References

External links
Richard Utley at Cricinfo
Richard Utley at CricketArchive

1906 births
1968 deaths
People from Havant
English cricketers
Hampshire cricketers
Royal Air Force cricketers
Gentlemen cricketers